Chaba may refer to:
 Chaba, J-Pop group
 Chaba River, Canada
 Chaba River China
 Typhoon Chaba (disambiguation)